The Haitian ambassador in Berlin is the official representative of the Government in Port-au-Prince to the Government of Germany.

List of representatives

References 

 
Germany
Haiti